Suddhodhan Rural municipality (Kapilvastu)

Labani  is a village development committee in Kapilvastu District in the Lumbini Zone of southern Nepal. VDC (Ward) Name was Suddhodhan Rural municipality. They Total area (91.69 km). Current  population of 45201 people in 2021  .

References

Populated places in Kapilvastu District